The 1985 NFL season was the 66th regular season of the National Football League. The season ended with Super Bowl XX when the Chicago Bears defeated the New England Patriots 46–10 at the Louisiana Superdome. The Bears became the second team in NFL history (after the previous season's San Francisco 49ers) to win 15 games in the regular season and 18 including the playoffs.

Player movement

Transactions

Retirements
August 30, 1985: Four-time Super Bowl champion Franco Harris announces his retirement.

Draft
The 1985 NFL Draft was held from April 30 to May 1, 1985, at New York City's Omni Park Central Hotel. With the first pick, the Buffalo Bills selected defensive end Bruce Smith from Virginia Tech.

Major rule changes

Whenever a team time out is called after the two-minute warning of each half or overtime, it should only last a minute instead of 90 seconds.
A play is immediately dead anytime the quarterback performs a kneel-down (the quarterback immediately kneels down after receiving the snap) after the two-minute warning of each half, or whenever the player declares himself down by sliding feet first on the ground. The ball is then spotted at the point where the player touches the ground first.
Pass interference is not to be called when a pass is clearly uncatchable.
Both "Roughing the kicker" and "Running into the kicker" fouls are not to be called if the defensive player was blocked into the kicker.
The definition of a valid fair catch signal is clearly defined as one arm that is fully extended above the head and waved from side to side.
Goaltending (leaping up to deflect a kick as it passes through the goal posts) is illegal.
The officials' uniform changed slightly. Instead of wearing black stirrups with two white stripes over white sanitary hose, the officials began wearing a one-piece sock similar to those worn by players, black with two white stripes on top and solid white on the bottom. These were first worn the previous season in Super Bowl XIX.
Defensive backs were ruled to have an "equal right to the ball", meaning that pass interference would not be called if the defensive player was looking back attempting to intercept the ball, and that any contact with the receiver did not materially affect the receiver's ability to catch the ball.

1985 deaths
Denver Broncos tight ends coach Fran Polsfoot died on April 5, 1985, after suffering from brain cancer.

Regular season

Scheduling formula

Highlights of the 1985 season included:
Thanksgiving: Two games were played on Thursday, November 28, featuring the New York Jets at Detroit and the St. Louis Cardinals at Dallas, with Detroit and Dallas winning.

Final standings

Tiebreakers

Los Angeles Raiders were the first AFC seed ahead of Miami based on better record against common opponents (5–1 to Dolphins' 4–2).
N.Y. Jets were the first AFC Wild Card based on better conference record (9–3) than New England (8–4) and Denver (8–4).
New England was the second AFC Wild Card ahead of Denver based on better record against common opponents (4–2 to Broncos' 3–3).
Cincinnati finished ahead of Pittsburgh in the AFC Central based on head-to-head sweep (2–0).
Seattle finished ahead of San Diego in the AFC West based on head-to-head sweep (2–0).
Dallas finished ahead of N.Y. Giants and Washington in the NFC East based on better head-to-head record (4–0 to Giants' 1–3 and Redskins' 1–3).
N.Y. Giants were the first NFC Wild Card based on better conference record (8–4) than San Francisco (7–5) and Washington (6–6).
San Francisco was the second NFC Wild Card based on head-to-head victory over Washington (1–0).
Minnesota finished ahead of Detroit in the NFC Central based on better division record (3–5 to Lions' 2–6).

Playoffs

Milestones
The following players set all-time records during the season:

Statistical leaders

Team

Individual

Awards

Coaching changes

Offseason
Cleveland Browns: Marty Schottenheimer began his first full season as head coach of the Browns. He replaced Sam Rutigliano, who was fired after starting the 1984 season 1–7.
Detroit Lions: Monte Clark was fired and replaced by Darryl Rogers.
Indianapolis Colts: Rod Dowhower was named as head coach. Frank Kush resigned after the team went 4–11 to start the 1984 season. Offensive line coach Hal Hunter served as interim for the team's final 1984 game.
Minnesota Vikings: Les Steckel was fired. Bud Grant came out of retirement for a second stint with the Vikings.
New England Patriots: Raymond Berry began his first full season as head coach. He replaced Ron Meyer, who was fired after eight games into the 1984 season.
Tampa Bay Buccaneers: John McKay retired and was replaced by Leeman Bennett.

In-season
Buffalo Bills: Kay Stephenson was fired after going 0–4 to start the season. Defensive coordinator Hank Bullough was named as interim.
Houston Oilers: Hugh Campbell was fired after 14 games. Defensive coordinator Jerry Glanville took over for the final two games, then was given the job permanently for 1986. 
New Orleans Saints: Bum Phillips resigned after 12 games. Wade Phillips, his son and the team's defensive coordinator, served as interim for the last four games.
Philadelphia Eagles: Marion Campbell was fired before the final game of the season. Fred Bruney as interim for that last game.

Uniform changes
 Due to their unpopularity, the Cleveland Browns removed the striping patterns and number outlines that they introduced in 1984. They returned to their brown and white jerseys, and white pants combination used prior to 1975. Face masks remained white.
 The Minnesota Vikings switched from white to purple face masks and wore white shoes for the first time. 
 The Philadelphia Eagles replace the sleeve stripes with their "eagle in flight" logo.
 The San Diego Chargers switched from dark royal blue to navy blue jerseys, and from gold to white pants.

Television
This was the fourth year under the league's five-year broadcast contracts with ABC, CBS, and NBC to televise Monday Night Football, the NFC package, and the AFC package, respectively. Joe Namath replaced Don Meredith in the MNF booth, joining Frank Gifford and O. J. Simpson.

References

1985 NFL Season Schedule
 NFL Record and Fact Book
 NFL History 1981–1990 (Last accessed December 4, 2005)
 Total Football: The Official Encyclopedia of the National Football League

National Football League seasons
 
National Football League